Marco Aurélio Ribeiro Sousa (born 29 January 1995 in Porto) is a Portuguese professional footballer who plays for U.S.C. Paredes as a goalkeeper.

References

External links

Portuguese League profile 

1995 births
Living people
Footballers from Porto
Portuguese footballers
Association football goalkeepers
Primeira Liga players
Liga Portugal 2 players
Campeonato de Portugal (league) players
S.C. Salgueiros players
F.C. Paços de Ferreira players
Gondomar S.C. players
U.S.C. Paredes players